Toivo Jürgenson (born 28 August 1957 in Tallinn) is an Estonian engineer, entrepreneur and politician. He was a member of the VII, VIII and IX Riigikogu, representing the Pro Patria Union party.

1994-1995 he was Minister of Economic Affairs and 1999-2002 Minister of Road and Communications.

References

1957 births
Living people
Estonian engineers
Estonian businesspeople
Pro Patria Union politicians
Members of the Riigikogu, 1992–1995
Members of the Riigikogu, 1995–1999
Members of the Riigikogu, 1999–2003
Government ministers of Estonia
Recipients of the Order of the National Coat of Arms, 5th Class
Tallinn University of Technology alumni
Politicians from Tallinn